Hualmay District is one of twelve districts of the province Huaura in Peru.

References

External links
  Municipal web site